Lamia Essaadi (born 3 October 1979) is a Moroccan former professional tennis player.

Essaadi has career-high WTA rankings of 469 in singles, achieved on 30 April 2001, and 398 in doubles, set on 9 November 1998. She won one singles title on the ITF Women's Circuit. Her only WTA Tour main-draw appearance came at the 2008 Grand Prix SAR La Princesse Lalla Meryem.

Playing for Morocco Fed Cup team, Essaadi has a win–loss record of 3–0.

ITF finals

Singles: 3 (1 title, 2 runner–ups)

Doubles: 1 (runner–up)

Fed Cup participation

Singles

ITF Junior finals

Doubles (2–0)

References

External links
 
 
 

1979 births
Living people
Sportspeople from Casablanca
Moroccan female tennis players
20th-century Moroccan women